Ethan Smith may refer to:

Ethan Smith (clergyman), writer of View of the Hebrews
Ethan Smith (Neighbours), fictional character from the Australian soap opera Neighbours